Parvathy Thiruvothu Kottuvattaa (born 7 April 1988) is an Indian actress who predominantly appears in Malayalam and Tamil language films. She is the recipient of a National Film Award, four Filmfare Awards South, and two Kerala State Film Awards.

Thiruvothu began her career with the Malayalam film Out of Syllabus (2006), and won her first Filmfare Award for her performance in the Tamil romantic drama Poo (2008). She gained wider attention in the next decade for her roles in the Malayalam films Bangalore Days (2014), Ennu Ninte Moideen (2015), and Charlie (2015). This success continued with her leading roles in Take Off (2017), for which she won a National Film Award – Special Mention, Uyare and Virus (both 2019), and Puzhu (2022).

Early life and education
Parvathy was born on 7 April 1988 in Calicut, Kerala, to P. Vinod Kumar and T. K. Usha Kumari, who are both lawyers. She has a brother, Aum Thiruvothu Karunakaran.

During her schooling years, her family moved to Thiruvananthapuram and she pursued her studies there. After finishing school from Kendriya Vidyalaya, Pangode, she completed her B.A. in English Literature from All Saints College, Thiruvananthapuram. She was a successful television anchor at Kiran TV, a full-time music channel based in Thiruvananthapuram. She is also a trained Bharatanatyam dancer.

Career

Acting debut and success (2006–2011) 
Parvathy made her acting debut in the 2006 Malayalam film Out of Syllabus, portraying a supporting role as a college student. Her second venture, Rosshan Andrrews' Notebook, won media attention due to its theme on teenage pregnancy. She appeared alongside Roma Asrani and Mariya Roy, after being picked for one of the three main roles from five thousand applicants.  She was also seen in Sathyan Anthikkad's comedy-drama film, Vinodayathra (2007), playing a supporting role alongside an ensemble cast including Dileep, Mukesh and Meera Jasmine.

Her first leading role was in the Kannada film Milana, which became a commercial success upon release. Pairing alongside Puneet Rajkumar, she was a surprise selection for the film and began working on the film in April 2007. The film won mixed reviews, but the actress's role was praised with a critic noting she "has been a wonderful selection for the role", adding that "she has that right attitude for the role". The film went on to become a big commercial success, running for 500 days at a multiplex in Bangalore. She returned to the Malayalam industry portraying the leading female role in Sibi Malayil's Flash with Mohanlal and Indrajith, and prior to release revealed that she hoped the film would give a breakthrough as a lead actress in the industry. However, the film failed commercially and garnered poor reviews on release.

Parvathy was selected to play the lead role in Sasi's Poo (2008) and featured alongside Srikanth, portraying the role of a young Tamil village girl named Maari. She revealed that she had to forgo twelve other offers to commit to the film, noting that Sasi selected her after a successful audition. To acclimatize to the role, the actress had to get her skin tone several shades darker and also visited a firework factory to study Maari's occupation. The actress revealed she found it difficult get out of character and became emotionally attached to the role she had played. Upon release, the film and her performance won rave reviews. A critic from Sify.com noted "Parvathy has lived in the role of Maari and takes your breath away as she effortlessly delivers such a difficult role so convincingly on her debut in Tamil", adding that "she is consistently credible and lifelike and absolutely riveting." Similarly, Rediff.com's reviewer mentioned that Poo is "almost entirely Parvathy's film" noting that "she's superb", while Malathi Rangarajan of The Hindu wrote, "Parvathy makes optimum use and plays a rustic belle to the hilt in attire and expression, also getting the body language right." The actress subsequently went on to win the Filmfare Award for Best Tamil Actress, while also securing other accolades and nominations from several other award juries, notably winning the Vijay Award for Best Debut Actress.

Her only release in 2009 was the Kannada film, Male Barali Manju Irali, directed by Vijayalakshmi Singh, where she dubbed for the role in her own voice. Parvathy accepted the venture, which featured mostly rookie technicians, noting that she was impressed by the director's script and revealed she had turned down several offers from Tamil filmmakers during the period who had wanted to cast her in roles similar to her character from Poo. The film won rave reviews, with a critic noting "Parvathy steals the show" and that "she comes with one of the most absorbing performances", adding that "her level of commitment to the role could be gauged by the way she has taken pains to dub in an alien language almost perfectly."

In 2010, Parvathy again teamed up with Puneet Rajkumar in Prithvi, which was based on the political situation in Karnataka. The director has earmarked her for the role when writing the script and her re-collaboration with Puneet after the success of Milana was built up by the media. Though the film opened to positive reviews, critics noted the little scope that Parvathy's character had in the film, noting that "she was mostly confined to the songs". Her Malayalam film City of God (2011), which was directed by Lijo Jose Pellissery, opened to mixed reviews. Despite the commercial failure of the project, critics noted she was "just brilliant" and a "dynamo" in her role as a Tamil refugee girl. The actress took a voluntary break after the film's release, deciding to become choosier while selecting scripts.

Established actress (2013-2014) 
Her first release in 2013, was the Kannada romantic film Andhar Bahar co-starring Shivrajkumar, which told the story of the relationship between a newly married criminal and his wife. She dubbed with her own voice for the film again, revealing that she chose to star in the film as the role had scope for her to perform. The film opened to good reviews, with a critic noting "Parvathy lights up the screen whenever she appears and is a delight to watch". She was next seen in the 2013 Tamil thriller film, Chennaiyil Oru Naal, featuring her alongside an ensemble cast. The film, a remake of the 2011 Malayalam film Traffic, has its narrative in a hyperlink format and Parvathy won good reviews for her small role as Aditi. She has then signed to essay a leading role in Bharat Bala's romantic drama Maryan opposite Dhanush. The director had seen her performance in Poo and subsequently auditioned her for the part, with Parvathy noting that the character was the best she has played to date. She portrayed Panimalar, a girl in love with the titular character Maryan, who inspires him to overcome his struggles. During production, the actress helped get into the mind of the character by working with fishermen, while also learning how to swim for underwater scenes. The film received unanimously positive reviews and successful box office collections in June 2013. A reviewer from Sify.com noted Parvathy "leaves a lasting impression", while another critic noted that she "is totally in sync with Dhanush all the way; she has matched him step for step, never allowing him to overshadow her." Times of India's review noted "Parvathy is the other pillar of the film, and comes up with a scintillating performance", adding "it is such a pleasure to watch her portray the various emotions". Her portrayal as Panimalar made received her multiple nominations for Best Actress, most notably the Filmfare Award for Best Actress - Tamil and the Vijay Award for Best Actress.

Her only 2014 release, Bangalore Days directed by Anjali Menon, was a high commercial success, with reports claiming that it was "one of the biggest hits in the history of Malayalam cinema". An ensemble cast including Dulquer Salmaan, Nivin Pauly, Fahadh Faasil, Nazriya Nazim, Nithya Menen and Isha Talwar. Parvathy's performance as RJ Sarah was well appreciated & she went on to win several accolades, including the Filmfare Award for Best Supporting Actress – Malayalam.

Ennu Ninte Moideen and beyond (2015-present) 
In 2015, she appeared in the romance film Ennu Ninte Moideen which narrated the tragic love tale of Kanchanamala and Moideen which happened in the 1960s in Mukkam, a riverside village in Kerala. The film opened to critical acclaim, with several critics regarding it as one of the greatest romance films made in Malayalam. Parvathy's performance was acclaimed critically & commercially. She went onto win many accolades most notably her first Filmfare Award for Best Actress – Malayalam Her final release of 2015 was Charlie alongside Dulquer Salmaan, Aparna Gopinath & Nedumudi Venu. The film went to win 8 Kerala State Film Awards, with Parvathy winning the Best Actress Award for both Charlie and Ennu Ninte Moideen.

In 2016, Parvathy had one release, Bangalore Naatkal, directed by Bommarillu Bhaskar, where she reprised her character RJ Sarah, from the Malayalam film Bangalore Days.

Parvathy had two releases in 2017. The first was Take Off, directed by Mahesh Narayan. The film also stars Kunchacko Boban and Fahadh Faasil. Celebrities praised the movie, including actor Kamal Haasan. The film was screened at international festivals, including the International Film Festival of India and the International Film Festival of Kerala. The film ran for over 125 days in theatres. Parvathy's performance was highly acclaimed. She went on to win IFFI Best Actor Award (Female), becoming the first ever Indian film actress to win the silver peacock award. She was also nominated for National Film Award for Best Actress, where she lost to Sridevi in the final round. She, went on to win her first National Film Award – Special Mention a second Kerala State Film Award for Best Actress and her second Filmfare Award for Best Actress - Malayalam. She made her Bollywood debut opposite Irrfan Khan in Qarib Qarib Singlle in 2017.

In 2018, Parvathy had two releases. The first was My Story, directed by Roshni Dinaker, where she was paired with Prithviraj. Her next release was Anjali Menon's Koode. This was Parvathy's third movie with Prithviraj, while her second movie with Anjali Menon and Nazriya Nazim, who was making her comeback after four years. The film received good reviews from both critics and audiences.

In 2019, Parvathy had two releases. The first was debutant Manu Ashokan's Uyare. Her role as Pallavi Raveendran, an acid attack survivor got appreciation from the critics as well as the audience. Her second release was Aashiq Abu's Virus, which was produced by Rima Kallingal. The film was about the Nipah Virus outbreak that happened in Kerala in 2018 which affected many lives. The film as well as her role was well received by both critics and the audience.

Other work and media 
Parvathy, who played Dhanush's love interest in the movie Maryan, gave a startling statement to the media. When asked if she agreed to be a part of Maryan because of her co-star Dhanush, who is now a sensation, she said that she didn't know Dhanush before Maryan.

Parvathy was one of the firsts to openly state that films with misogynistic dialogue should not be encouraged. She named the veteran actor Mammootty's film Kasaba (2016 film), as one such movie. She requested that senior actors like Mammootty who is much respected and has a wide fan following should henceforth refrain from acting in movies that have such misogynistic scripts for the betterment of the society at large. Parvathy's viewpoint came under much criticism and she became the victim of cyber-bullying. She was viciously trolled and abused on various online platforms by Mammootty fans, two of them were arrested by Kerala police following a complaint from her. She had also spoken about the reality of Islamophobia in the industry, even in her films like Ennu Ninte Moideen & Take off, deciding not to repeat such mistakes.

She is one of the founding members of Women in Cinema Collective, the organization for the welfare of women workers in the Malayalam movie industry.

In 2019, Parvathy criticized Arjun Reddy and Kabir Singh at a roundtable organised by Film Companion for glorifying misogyny, abuse and toxic masculinity in the films at the International Film Festival of India (IFFI). Her comments against Arjun Reddy were met with a lot of appreciation and many pointed out that she was brave enough to address the issue in front of the film's lead actor Vijay Deverakonda. Later, Deverakonda criticized social media trollers during an interview for blowing the issue out of proportion while simultaneously emphasising how much he respected Parvathy and her work.

In October 2020, she resigned from the Association of Malayalam Movie Artists (AMMA) to protest against General Secretary Edavela Babu's controversial remarks about a fellow female actor. She also demanded the resignation of Babu and urged other members of the body to seek the same.

Filmography

Film

Web series

Television
She was the VJ (anchor) of the music show Tamil Hits on Kiran TV.
She had a major role in the TV serial Pavithrabandham.

Awards and nominations

References

External links

 
 
 

Indian film actresses
Indian voice actresses
Actresses in Kannada cinema
Actresses in Tamil cinema
Actresses from Kochi
Living people
Filmfare Awards South winners
Kendriya Vidyalaya alumni
Actresses from Kozhikode
21st-century Indian actresses
Indian women television presenters
Indian television presenters
Actresses in Malayalam cinema
Actresses in Malayalam television
Kerala State Film Award winners
Special Mention (feature film) National Film Award winners
IFFI Best Actor (Female) winners
1988 births
Women artists from Kerala
Actresses in Hindi cinema